Jack Slough is a stream in the eastern Sacramento Valley, near Yuba City in Yuba County, California.

It is a tributary of the Sacramento River.

History
The stream was formerly called Nigger Jack Slough. The slough was likely named for a black miner in the California Gold Rush.

See also
List of rivers of California

References

Rivers of Yuba County, California
Geography of the Sacramento Valley
Tributaries of the Sacramento River
Yuba City, California
Mountain ranges of Northern California